What Women Dream is a 1933 German comedy crime film directed by Géza von Bolváry and starring Nora Gregor, Gustav Fröhlich, and Otto Wallburg. In 1934 it was remade as an American film One Exciting Adventure. The film's sets were designed by the art directors Emil Hasler and Willy Schiller.

Cast

References

Bibliography

External links 
 

1933 films
Films of the Weimar Republic
German crime comedy films
1930s crime comedy films
1930s German-language films
Films directed by Géza von Bolváry
Bavaria Film films
German black-and-white films
Films with screenplays by Franz Schulz
Films with screenplays by Billy Wilder
1933 comedy films
Films scored by Robert Stolz
1930s German films